Africa Beyond is a project celebrating African arts and culture in the UK, supported by Arts Council England, the British Broadcasting Corporation, the British Museum, the Southbank Centre, iniva (Institute for International Visual Arts) and other partners.

Africa Beyond was founded in March 2006, based in London. It was created as a legacy of Africa 05, a major celebration of African arts, held throughout 2005. It organises artist residencies linking Africa and the UK, runs public events such as the Word from Africa festival (first hosted at the British Museum in May 2007), and works with arts venues to improve their links with African audiences and artists.

The BBC hosted the Africa Beyond website, which features articles on African music, film, theatre, dance, literature and visual arts, with a special focus on artists and stories relevant to audiences in the UK. The website is no longer updated.

References

External links
 BBC official site

African artist groups and collectives
BBC
British Museum in media